The Myanmar Language Commission Transcription System (1980), also known as the MLC Transcription System (MLCTS), is a transliteration system for rendering Burmese in the Latin alphabet. It is loosely based on the common system for romanization of Pali, has some similarities to the ALA-LC romanization and was devised by the Myanmar Language Commission. The system is used in many linguistic publications regarding Burmese and is used in MLC publications as the primary form of romanization of Burmese.

The transcription system is based on the orthography of formal Burmese and is not suited for colloquial Burmese, which has substantial differences in phonology from formal Burmese. Differences are mentioned throughout the article.

There are some instances in which the regular Burmese script is used on devices (e.g. computers, smartphones, tablets, etc.).

Features 
Coalesced letters transcribe stacked consonants.
Consonantal transcriptions (for initials) are similar to those of Pali.
Finals are transcribed as consonants rather than glottal stops
Nasalized finals are transcribed as consonants rather than as a single  final.
The anunasika and  final are not differentiated.
The colon and the period transcribe two tones: heavy and creaky respectively.
Special transcriptions are used for abbreviated syllables used in literary Burmese.

Transcription system

Initials and finals
The following initials are listed in the traditional ordering of the Burmese script, with the transcriptions of the initials listed before their IPA equivalents:

1Sometimes used as a final, but preceding diacritics determine its pronunciation.

The Burmese alphabet is arranged in groups of five, and within each group, consonants can stack one another. The consonant above the stacked consonant is the final of the previous vowel. Most words of Sino-Tibetan origin are spelt without stacking, but polysyllabic words of Indo-European origin (such as Pali, Sanskrit, and English) are often spelt with stacking. Possible combinations are as follows:

1 is uncommonly spelt .

All consonantal finals are pronounced as glottal stops, except for nasal finals. All possible combinations are as follows, and correspond to the colors of the initials above:

Nasalised finals are transcribed differently. Transcriptions of the following diacritical combinations in Burmese for nasalised finals are as follows:

Monophthongs are transcribed as follows:

Tones 

Medial consonants 
A medial is a semivowel that comes before the vowel. In Standard Burmese, there are three pronounced medials. The following are medials in the MLC Transcription System:

†The two medials are pronounced the same in Standard Burmese. In dialects such as Rakhine (Arakanese), the latter is pronounced .

Abbreviated syllables
Formal Burmese has four abbreviated symbols, which are typically used in literary works:

See also
Burmese script
Burmese language

References

External links 
 Appendix on MLCTS from Paulette Hopple's Doctoral Thesis
 Romabama transcription system by U Kyaw Tun
 Library of Congress ALA-LC romanization tables

Romanization
Burmese language